The Medellín small-eared shrew (Cryptotis medellinia) is a species of mammal in the family Soricidae. The species is found in montane forest and cultivated areas, and is subject to predation from the crab-eating fox. The specific name refers to the city of Medellín.

References

Cryptotis
Mammals of Colombia
Mammals of the Andes
Endemic fauna of Colombia
Mammals described in 1921
Taxa named by Oldfield Thomas